The Jewish Community Relations Council of Minnesota and the Dakotas is an organization dedicated to serving as the public affairs voice of the local Jewish communities of Minnesota and the Dakotas. The Jewish Community Relations Council (JCRC) fights anti-Semitism and prejudice, advocates for Israel, provides Holocaust education, promotes tolerance and social justice, and builds bridges across the Jewish and broader communities.

Early history 
The organization now known as the Jewish Community Relations Council of Minnesota and the Dakotas first took shape in 1938 as the Anti-Defamation Council of Minnesota, soon renamed the Minnesota Jewish Council under the leadership of Samuel Scheiner. Scheiner reviewed reports of anti-Semitic incidents, fighting against hate-filled leaflets and anti-Jewish remarks, while also attempting to expose discrimination by real estate agents and employers who attempted to subvert anti-discrimination laws. The rise of anti-Semitism in the 1930s—from the American Nationalist group the Silver Legion of America, or Silver Shirts, to a volatile gubernatorial political campaign in 1938 with an overtly anti-Semitic campaign against Elmer Benson—galvanized the state's Jewish community to action. Through the Second World War, the group continued to combat rising interreligious and intergroup tension while also raising concern over employment discrimination directed against Jews.

In Autumn 1946, an issue of Common Ground by Carey McWilliams, titled "Minneapolis: The Curious Twin" asserted that "Minneapolis is the capitol of anti-Semitism in the United States. In almost every walk of life, 'an iron curtain' separates Jews from non-Jews in Minneapolis." By 1947, the City Council of Minneapolis banned the dissemination hate literature and Minneapolis mayor Hubert H. Humphrey ordered an assessment of "intergroup relations" led by a collaboration of the NAACP, League of Women Voters, and the Minnesota Jewish Council. By 1952, overt anti-Semitic acts were on the decline.

After the State of Israel was established in 1948, support of this new Jewish state was integrated into their work. By 1959 the group changed its name to the Jewish Community Relations Council of Minnesota (JCRC).

Modern activism 
When Samuel Scheiner retired in 1974, new director Morton Ryweck ushered in a new era, merging with the local B'nai B'rith Anti-Defamation League (ADL) to form the JCRC/ADL. Ryweck retired in 1991.  The 1970s and 1980s saw a rise of advocacy work as part of the Soviet Jewry Movement. By 2013 the JCRC of Minnesota and the Dakotas became independent of ADL.

Jewish Community Relations Council of Minnesota and the Dakotas continues to monitor and combat violations of church-state separation in public schools, work to promote legislation to answer the needs of the underprivileged in Minnesota, and works as part of the Joint Religious Legislative Coalition. Its Tolerance Minnesota project provides diversity and Holocaust educational resources for parents and teachers.

References

External links 
 
 Finding aid to the Jewish Community Relations Council records at the Minnesota Historical Society.
 Finding aid to the Jewish Community Relations Council records at the Upper Midwest Jewish Archives, University of Minnesota Libraries.

1938 establishments in Minnesota
Jews and Judaism in Minnesota
Non-profit organizations based in Minnesota
Jewish organizations based in the United States
Jewish organizations established in 1938
Jews and Judaism in South Dakota
Jews and Judaism in North Dakota